Landscape with Open Door is an album by guitarist Pierre Dørge and vibraphonist Walt Dickerson recorded in 1978 for the SteepleChase label.

Reception

Allmusic gave the album 3 stars.

Track listing
All compositions by Pierre Dørge.
 "Song for Irene" – 1:06
 "Tribute to Master Tchicai" – 4:08
 "Landscape with Open Door" – 10:37
 "Mirjam's Blue Umbrella" – 1:49 	
 "Bossa Kodania" – 4:58
 "Green Symmetry/Witches Weep and Dance" – 17:42
 "Tai-Gong" – 7:18

Personnel 
Pierre Dørge – guitar, percussion
Walt Dickerson – vibraphone, percussion

References 

1979 albums
Pierre Dørge albums
Walt Dickerson albums
SteepleChase Records albums